Jamaica competed at the 2019 Parapan American Games held from August 23 to September 1, 2019 in Lima, Peru. In total athletes representing Jamaica won two silver medals and two bronze medals. The country finished in 20th place in the medal table.

Medalists

Athletics 

Chadwick Campbell won the silver medal in the men's 100 metres T13 event.

Santana Campbell won the silver medal in the women's javelin throw F56 event.

Judo 

Theador Subba won one of the bronze medals in the men's +100 kg event.

Taekwondo 

Shauna-Kay T. Hines won one of the bronze medals in the women's 58 kg event.

References 

2019 in Jamaican sport
Nations at the 2019 Parapan American Games